Over time, commercial airlines have established a number of scheduled ultra long-haul non-stop flights. These exceptionally long routes reduce the travel time between distant city pairs as well as the number of stops needed for passengers' travels, thereby increasing passenger convenience.  For an airline, choosing to operate long flights can also build brand image as well as loyalty among a set of flyers. Thus there is competition among airlines to establish the longest flight.

Definition
The length of a flight can be defined in different ways. Typically, the great-circle distance between the origin and destination is used, but alternative metrics include the duration of the flight, and the actual distance flown (when a longer route can use the jet stream to reduce the total travel time). Also, although the term is most commonly used to compare between different non-stop flights, direct flights with stops (same flight number used for full journey) might also be compared on some occasions.

There are numerous different types of flights globally operated by different aircraft for different industries and purposes. The term "longest flight" is most commonly used in reference to flights that are commercial, passenger, and scheduled, such that the flight details are published and tickets are available for purchase.

Current longest route
The "world's longest flight" has disputed status because it is a non-specific claim. While the distance between two cities is constant, aircraft don't always follow straight paths but adjust their flight paths based on headwinds, tailwinds, and other weather events and to avoid flying over certain countries because of politics or war.

By great-circle distance

This route was operated from March to April 2020.

This route was previously operated with a refuelling stop at Los Angeles International Airport, where all passengers would disembark the aircraft and pass through U.S. Customs and Border Protection before reboarding and continuing to Paris. However, to comply with COVID-19 pandemic restrictions banning European travelers from entering the United States, this service opted not to stop at Los Angeles during its flights in March–April 2020. The route was also made possible by the aircraft's reduced passenger load of about 150 passengers, which eliminated the need to refuel. This route also set a record for the world's longest domestic passenger flight, as it flew between French territories.

By ground distance traveled
Routings may avoid great-circle routes, despite their shorter ground distance, in order to avoid headwinds and/or use tailwinds to save time and fuel, shortening the equivalent still-air distance.

Cathay Pacific flights from Hong Kong to New York–JFK will also sometimes fly  ground routes, instead of a  great-circle route, for the same reason.

Emirates sometimes flies the EK448 flight from Dubai to Auckland almost entirely over ocean, all the way from the coast of Oman to New Zealand. The only land it flies over is Tasmania and in some cases it goes even south of Tasmania, due to strong winds which makes it consume less fuel and flying faster despite the longer distance than the great circle distance which travels across Australia. That means that it flies across 13000 km of ocean only which is not performed at any other commercial flight.

History
Since the first scheduled commercial passenger flight in 1914 that covered , records for the longest flight (by great-circle distance) were rapidly set and continue to be set today.

1920s and 1930s

The longest non-stop commercial flights of the 1930s were operated by flying boats which were the predominant aircraft type of the time for long-range flight, in part as they didn't require large airports capable of receiving large aircraft.

1940s and 1950s

1960s and 1970s

1980s and 1990s

2000s

2010s and 2020s

In the late 2000s/early 2010s, rising fuel prices coupled with the Great Recession caused the cancellation of many ultra long-haul, non-stop flights. This included the services provided by Singapore Airlines from Singapore to both Newark and Los Angeles that were ended in late 2013. But, as fuel prices have since decreased and more fuel-efficient aircraft have come into service, many ultra long-haul routes were reinstated or newly-scheduled.

Other record flights (non-scheduled)

Promotional and delivery flights
A number of promotional or delivery flights have extended the record of longest non-stop flights by a commercial aircraft:

Non-scheduled commercial flights

Airliners
The longest-range Airbus jetliner in service is the Airbus A350-900ULR, which is capable of flying . The A380 is capable of flying  with 544 passengers. The standard A350-900 can fly  with 325 passengers.

The longest-range Boeing airliner in service is the 777-200LR, which can cover  with 314 passengers. The announced Boeing 777-8 will be capable of flying  with 350 to 375 passengers. The Boeing 787-9 can fly 14,140 km (7,635 nmi) with 290 passengers.

Many long-haul, non-stop routes that used to be uneconomical to operate are being made viable by the Airbus A330neo, the Airbus A350 XWB, and the Boeing 787 Dreamliner.

Longest passenger flights

Non-stop flights (top 30, by great-circle distance)
The following table lists the world's longest non-stop scheduled passenger routes by great-circle distance. The actual distance flown, however, can be longer than the great-circle distance for a variety of reasons, such as avoiding severe weather, taking advantage of favorable winds aloft, detouring around closed airspace, and diverting around conflict zones.

For the purposes of this table, multiple flights operated by the same airline between the same airports are counted as one flight, while different airlines operating between the same airports are counted separately. Also, each airport pair is counted separately, even though some cities have multiple airports supporting long-range flights (e.g. Heathrow and Gatwick airports serving London, and Haneda and Narita serving Tokyo).

{| class="wikitable sortable" style="text-align:left;"
|- 
! class="sortable" | Rank !! From !! To !! Airline 
!Flight number!! Distance !! Scheduled
duration
! Aircraft !! First flight
|-
| 1 || ||| rowspan="2" ||| rowspan="2" | Singapore Airlines
|SQ 23||  || 18:50 || A350-900ULR|| 
|-
|2
| Newark
|SQ 21
|
|18:45
|A350-900ULR
|
|-
|3
|
| 
| rowspan="2" |Qantas
|QF 9
|
|17:25
|787-9
|
|-
|4
|
| Melbourne
|QF 22
|
|17:35
|787-9
|Dec 3, 2022
|-
|5
|
|
|Air New Zealand
|NZ 1
|
|17:50
|787-9
|
|-
| 6 
||| ||Emirates
|EK 449||  || 17:25 || A380-800|| 
|-
| 7 || || || Singapore Airlines
|SQ 37, SQ 35||  || 17:50 || Airbus A350 XWB |A350-900|| 
|-
|8
|
| Bengaluru
|Air India
|AI 176
|
|17:55
|777-200LR
|Dec 2, 2022
|- 
| 9 || 
| rowspan="2" ||| United Airlines
|UA 101||  || 17:35 || 787-9 || 
|-
| 10 || || Qantas
|QF 8||  || 17:20 || 787-9|| 
|-
| 11 || || || Philippine Airlines
|PR 127||  || 17:15 || A350-900777-300ER || 
|-
| rowspan="2" | 12 || rowspan="2" |  San Francisco|| rowspan="2" |  Singapore|| United Airlines
|UA 1, UA 29|| rowspan="2" |  || rowspan="2" | 17:35 || 787-9 ||
|-
| Singapore Airlines 
|SQ 31, SQ 33|| A350-900A350-900ULR
| 
|-
|13
| Johannesburg
| Atlanta
|Delta Air Lines
|DL 201
|
|16:20
|A350-900
|
|-
|14
| San Francisco
| Mumbai
|Air India
|AI 180
|
|17:10
|777-200LR
|Dec 15, 2022 
|-
| 15 || 
| rowspan="3" | Los Angeles|| Emirates
|EK 215||  || 16:20 || A380-800
| 
|-
| 16 || || Saudia
|SV 41||  || 16:25 || 777-300ER || 
|-
| 17 ||  || Qatar Airways
|QR 739, QR 741||  || 16:25 || A350-1000|| 
|-
|18
|
| Rome–Fiumicino
|Qantas
|QF 5
|
|16:25
|787-9
|
|-
| 19 || || || Philippine Airlines
|PR 119||  || 16:50 || 777-300ER || 
|- 
| 20 || || || Air New Zealand
|NZ 27||  ||16:30 || 787-9 || 
|-
| 21 || || || Emirates
|EK 211||  || 16:15 || A380-800 || 
|-
|22
| Cape Town
| Atlanta
|Delta Air Lines
|DL 238
|
|16:10
|A350-900
|Dec 3, 2022
|-
| 23 
||| rowspan="2" | 
|Emirates||EK 225||  || 16:00 || A380-800|| 
|-
|24
| Doha
|
|QR 737
|
|15:45
|A350-1000
|
|-
| 25 ||  ||  || Cathay Pacific
|||  || 16:15 || A350-900A350-1000 || 
|-
|26
| Seattle
| Singapore
|Singapore Airlines
|SQ 27
|
|16:10
|A350-900
|
|-
| 27 || || || Qatar Airways
|QR 713||  || 16:15 || A350-1000 ||
|-
| 28 || || || Emirates
|EK 221||  || 16:15 || 777-200LR
| 
|-
|29
| Johannesburg
| Newark
|United Airlines
|UA 187
|12,858 km (7,990 mi; 6,943 nmi)
|16:00
|787-9
|June 3, 2021
|-
|30
|
| Boston
|Cathay Pacific
|CX 812
|12,826 km (7,970 mi; 6,925 nmi)
|15:55
|A350-900
A350-1000
|May 3, 2015
|}

Direct flights with stops

A direct flight between an origin and final destination has an intermediate stop, with all segments having the same flight number and using the same aircraft. In the following table, the "Origin – Destination" column lists the great-circle distance between the origin and final destination, excluding the stop. The "All Sectors" column lists the total great-circle distance from the origin to the stop to the final destination.
The table rows shaded in gray denote flights that are scheduled, but currently unticketable during a pause in operations in response to the COVID-19 pandemic.

Discontinued non-stop flights

Longest passenger flights (by aircraft type)
The sections below gives two separate views. The first one lists all the commercial passenger aircraft types and their currently scheduled and operating longest non-stop flight. The second section lists the longest non-stop flight ever regularly scheduled and operated by that commercial passenger aircraft type.

Current
The table below lists the current longest (by great-circle distance) non-stop flights operated by different types of aircraft.

Records
The table below lists the longest (by great-circle distance) regularly scheduled non-stop revenue flights ever operated by different types of aircraft. The table does not include special promotional or delivery flights, such as shown above.

Future routes

Scheduled services
New and soon to be launched non-stop flights with distances exceeding , placing them on the top 30 list, have been announced:

Envisioned services
 According to a report published in September 2015, Miami International Airport (Florida) was in talks with EVA Air and China Airlines of Taiwan to launch before 2018 a non-stop  flight to Taipei. In June 2016, a chartered China Airlines Boeing 777-300ER carrying Taiwan President Tsai Ing-wen flew non-stop from Taipei to Miami before continuing to Panama. The airport director spoke with President Tsai about the opportunity for scheduled service between Miami and Taipei. The airport has been actively pursuing a non-stop flight to East Asia since 2015. There are no non-stop passenger flights between Florida, the third-most populous state in the U.S., and East Asia. In May 2017, the region's aviation department director predicted such a flight would happen within the next 24 months.  In November 2020, Starlux Airlines applied for rights to operate this Taipei – Miami route along with 14 others.  In May 2021, Starlux announced postponement of Transpacific flights to "end of 2022 or beginning of 2023".
 On August 25, 2017, Qantas announced "Project Sunrise" aiming to launch new ultra-long-haul non-stop "Kangaroo Routes" from Australia to major destinations including London, New York, and Paris. On October 20, 2019, Qantas demonstrated the New York City to Sydney flight using a Boeing 787-9. The flight took 19 hours, 15 minutes and the 49 people on the plane were staff and selected guests. In order to make the flight possible, the weight had to be precisely trimmed by limiting the number of passengers and cargo weight. Two months later, departing on November 14, 2019 and landing on November 15, Qantas demonstrated another "Project Sunrise" route using a 787-9 to fly from London–Heathrow to Sydney Airport non-stop with 52 passengers on board. In December 2019, Qantas announced they had selected an Airbus A350-1000 (with some potential modifications) for Project Sunrise if the flights proceed.
Turkish Airlines' chairman stated in June 2022 that it is now evaluating using either A350-1000 or 777X aircraft for economical operation of this route.In their March 2023 earnings call, Turkish Airlines announced Sydney as one of their future targeted routes.
 In November 2019, El Al announced it was exploring a new non-stop Tel Aviv – Melbourne route with 3 initial scheduled roundtrip "test" flights, covering a great-circle distance of ,. While tickets went on sale in December 2019, due to the COVID-19 Pandemic's impact on international flights, only the first of the three flights was operated on April 2nd, 2020. The flight distance was 1000 km longer than the great-circle distance for the route due to flights to and from Israel were not allowed to traverse Saudi Arabian or Omani airspace. In July 2022, Saudi Arabia opened its airspace to all Israeli carriers for the first time and in February 2023 Oman opened its airspace to all "qualified commercial carriers" thus bringing the operation of this route along the great-circle routing closer to viability. In March 2024, El Al signed a LOI and announced they are (re)launching this route "by June 2024" with thrice weekly services using their Boeing 787 fleet.
Its launch was announced for October 2020. American Airlines subsequently announced because of global travel restrictions amid the global COVID-19 pandemic it would be pushed back to October 2021. Further delayed launch dates for 2021 were subsequently announced, until American Airlines definitely stated it would not launch in 2021 and would instead launch in March 2022,  In January 2022, American Airlines announced that the service will start in October 2022 and started selling tickets, before announcing in May 2022 that will not launch in 2022 either, stating: "We have paused the launch of scheduled service between Seattle and Bengaluru, India until summer 2023 [...] as this route requires flying through airspace currently involved in a military conflict, we postponed the flight out of an abundance of caution." As of January 2023, this flight remains unscheduled to resume in 2023.
In November 2021, Vietnam Airlines launched the first of such transpacific flights flying between Ho Chi Minh City and San Francisco.
 In February 2023, The CEO of Qantas announced they were looking into launching non-stop flights from Perth to Paris using their soon to arrive additional 787-9 aircraft, saying: “We want to do Paris and we’re talking to Air France and other European airlines about how we could do that.”  Citing constraints with terminal arrangements with Perth Airport, no further commitments or intended launch dates were given.

Services that never began
In August 2015, Emirates announced that non-stop flights between Dubai and Panama City, Panama would begin on 1 February 2016, covering  in 17 hours, 35 minutes westbound. In January 2016, the start was postponed to 31 March 2016. In early March 2016, Emirates postponed the route until the end of 2016 or early 2017 or "as soon as conditions allow." Emirates latest public update on this route was in April 2018 where Emirates' CCO stated "We are still looking at Panama. We had some conversations recently with a delegation from Panama". In 2015, it would have been the world's longest non-stop flight.

In July 2019, Qantas announced and began selling tickets for new non-stop flights between Brisbane and Chicago-O'Hare that would begin operation in April 2020 covering  in 16 hours, 20 minutes eastbound using a Boeing 787-9 aircraft.  (Flight number QF 85 and 86 in reference to the Chicago Bears 1986 Super Bowl Championship team). However, in March 2020, because of the COVID-19 pandemic Qantas announced it was delaying the route's launch to September 2020. In July 2020, as part of Australia's pandemic response, almost all international flights were canceled until March 2021, including this new route.  In January 2021, Qantas reopened its international flights for booking for 2021 and this new route was no longer included in their schedules for the foreseeable future/the rest of 2021.  It would have been the world's fourth longest non-stop flight.  In early 2023, the topic was surfaced again by Qantas, but still no firm plans announced for the envisioning of launching this route.

See also

Flight length
ETOPS/LROPS
Flight distance record
Flight endurance record
Longest Domestic Flight
Westray to Papa Westray flight, the shortest commercial flight in the world

Notes

References

Civil aviation
Flights
Commercial flights
Transport-related lists of superlatives
Flights